G. D. Naidu (Gopalaswamy Doraiswamy Naidu) (23 March 1893 – 4 January 1974) was an Indian inventor and engineer who is referred to as the "Edison of India" and "the wealth creator of Coimbatore". He is credited with the manufacture of the first electric motor in India. His contributions were primarily industrial but also spanned the fields of electrical, mechanical, agricultural (hybrid cultivation) and automobile engineering. Naidu developed an independently internal combustion four stroke engine. He had only primary education but excelled as a versatile genius. He is also known as "Miracle Man".

Personal life 
G.D. Naidu was born at Kalangal, Coimbatore on 23 March 1893 in Madras Presidency, British India. He was the son of a farmer. His childhood years were spent getting in trouble at school. He disliked attending classes.

Early life 

Naidu obtained work as a server in a hotel in Coimbatore with the intention of saving money to buy a motorcycle. After getting the vehicle he spent time dismantling and re-assembling it, and later became a mechanic. He began his transport business in 1920, with the purchase of an automobile coach. He drove it between Pollachi and Palani. In a few years, his Universal Motor Service (UMS) owned the most efficient fleet of public transport vehicles in the country. In 1937, the first motor to be produced in India was brought out from G. D. Naidu's factory – NEW (National Electric Works) at Peelamedu, Coimbatore.

Inventions and later life 
G.D. Naidu developed India's first indigenous motor in 1937 along with D. Balasundaram Naidu. The motor's success resulted in the founding of Textool by Balasundaram and, later, Lakshmi Machine Works (LMW).

Naidu's 'Rasant' razor incorporated a small motor operated by dry cells, called Heilbronn. Among his other inventions were super-thin shaving blades, a distance adjuster for film cameras, a fruit juice extractor, a tamper-proof vote-recording machine and a kerosene-run fan. In 1941, he announced that he had the ability to manufacture five-valve radio sets in India a mere ₹70/- a set. In 1952, the two-seater petrol engine car (costing ₹2000/-) rolled out. Production was stopped subsequently, because of the government's refusal to grant the necessary license. His inventiveness was not confined to machinery alone. He researched and identified new varieties in cotton, maize and papaya. His farm was visited by Sir C. V. Raman and Sir M. Visvesvaraya. From laying foundation to completion he built a house in just 11 hours, from 6am to 5pm.

In 1935, he personally filmed the funeral of King George V in London. He met Adolf Hitler in Germany. He invited K. Kamaraj to many functions. Among the Indian stalwarts that Naidu's camera captured were Mahatma Gandhi, Pandit Jawarharlal Nehru and Subhas Chandra Bose. Naidu remained an outsider to politics, despite having contested and lost in the 1936 provincial general elections. He was gifted a Rolls-Royce car and he was the only one who had this luxury car in those times.

In 1944, Naidu retired from active involvement with his automobile combine and announced several philanthropic measures including grants for research scholarships and welfare schemes for his employees and the depressed sections of society. In 1967, the G D Naidu Industrial Exhibition was established.

G.D. Naidu, Rathnasabapathy Mudaliar and India's first finance minister R. K. Shanmukham Chetty conducted survey, for bringing Siruvani water to the Coimbatore city.

Through Naidu's efforts and donations India's first polytechnic college, the Arthur Hope Polytechnic and the Arthur Hope College of Engineering were set up. Later the college moved to its present location and is now known as Government College of Technology (GCT). The college was named after the then Madras governor Arthur Hope. In 1945, GD Naidu was the principal of the college. Naidu was not satisfied with the four-year programs and said that it was a waste of time for students. He suggested that two years was more than enough to teach the same courses, even with different concentrations. However, the British government did not accept his idea and Naidu resigned from his post. The name Hope College for the original site of the college remains in Coimbatore even now.

Naidu died on 4 January 1974. Sir C V Raman said of Naidu: "A great educator, an entrepreneur in many fields of engineering and industry, a warm-hearted man filled with love for his fellows and a desire to help them in their troubles, Mr Naidu is truly a man in a million – perhaps this is an understatement!" He is survived by his son G.D. Gopal and grandchildren G.D. Rajkumar and Shantini. A permanent Industrial Exhibition in his memory is in Coimbatore. He provided employment in the engineering and manufacturing sectors to many individuals in the 1950s and 1960s.

Legacy 
G. D. Matriculation Higher Secondary School and G. D. Public School in Coimbatore are named after him. It is managed by his daughter-in-law Chandra Gopal. His grandson G. D. Rajkumar now runs the Geedee Industries. His granddaughter Shanthini Choudhry runs The Grand Regent hotel in Coimbatore.

In popular culture 
GD Naidu – The Edison of India is a documentary film, directed by K. Ranjit Kumar and produced by the Films Division of India, covering his life, times and contributions. It won the Best Science & Technology Film Award at the 66th National Film Awards.

References

External links 
 G.D.Naidu Museum & Industrial Exhibition in Coimbatore
 Vintage cycle at G.D. Naidu Museum, The Hindu

20th-century Indian inventors
1893 births
1974 deaths
People from Coimbatore
20th-century Indian engineers
Engineers from Tamil Nadu
Founders of Indian schools and colleges
20th-century Indian educators
20th-century Indian businesspeople
Educators from Tamil Nadu
Businesspeople from Tamil Nadu
Indian mechanical engineers